Air Vice Marshal Gary Martin Waterfall,  (born 7 January 1967) is a retired senior Royal Air Force officer and formerly Chief of Staff (Operations) in the Permanent Joint Headquarters. From July 2014 to April 2016, he was Air Officer Commanding No. 1 Group.
He also sponsors 2248(Rutland) squadron of the air training corps

RAF career
Waterfall was previously a Harrier pilot and a member of the Red Arrows display team. He was Officer Commanding No. 41 Squadron RAF from 1 April 2006 to 8 June 2007.

On 15 December 2010, Waterfall led the final 16-ship flypast of the Harrier when they were retired from service. On promotion to air commodore in June 2011, he was deployed to NATO's Combined Air Operations Centre 5 to assume command of the UK air contribution to the liberation of Libya, and was appointed a Commander of the Order of the British Empire in the Operational Honours List in March 2012.

From July 2014 to April 2016, he was Air Officer Commanding No. 1 Group. In that role, he is also head of the air defence of the United Kingdom. On 28 April 2016, Waterfall handed over the command of No. 1 Group to Gerry Mayhew. Waterfall was then appointed the Chief of Staff (Operations) in the Permanent Joint Headquarters with effect from 16 May 2016. Waterfall retired from the RAF on 31 December 2019.

References

1967 births
Commanders of the Order of the British Empire
Living people
Royal Air Force officers